The 2018 United States House of Representatives election in South Dakota was held on November 6, to elect the U.S. representative for South Dakota's at-large congressional district. The election coincided with other statewide, legislative, and local elections.

Incumbent Republican U.S. Representative Kristi Noem did not run for a fifth term and instead ran successfully for Governor of South Dakota. This is the first open seat election since 2004 and the first time a male candidate was elected since 2002. This would be the last House election that a Democrat contested, Johnson would face two different Libertarians in 2020 and 2022.

Republican primary

Candidates

Declared
 Dusty Johnson, former Chairman of the South Dakota Public Utilities Commission and former chief of staff to Governor Dennis Daugaard
 Shantel Krebs, Secretary of State of South Dakota
 Neal Tapio, State Senator, businessman and former Trump campaign director for South Dakota.

Declined
 Eric Terrell
 Kristi Noem, incumbent U.S. Representative (running for governor)

Polling

Primary results

Democratic primary

Candidates

Declared
 Tim Bjorkman, former circuit court judge

Failed to file 

 Chris Martian, former IT professional

Declined
 Shawn Bordeaux, state representative
 Troy Heinert, state senator
 J. R. LaPlante, former South Dakota Secretary of Tribal Relations and State House candidate in 2016
 Stephanie Herseth Sandlin, former U.S. Representative
 Mike Huether, Mayor of Sioux Falls (switched to Independent)
 Brendan Johnson, former United States Attorney for the District of South Dakota
 Billie Sutton, Minority Leader of the South Dakota Senate (running for governor)

Libertarian nomination

Candidates

Declared
 George Hendrickson, former police officer

Independents

Candidates

Declined
 Mike Huether, Mayor of Sioux Falls

General election

Predictions

Polling

Results

See also

 2018 United States House of Representatives elections
 2018 United States elections

References

External links
Candidates at Vote Smart 
Candidates at Ballotpedia 
Campaign finance at FEC 
Campaign finance at OpenSecrets

Official campaign websites
Tim Bjorkman (D) for Congress
George Hendrickson (L) for Congress
Dusty Johnson (R) for Congress
Ron Wieczorek (I) for Congress

2018
South Dakota
United States House of Representatives